Blood & Honour is a neo-Nazi music promotion network and right-wing extremist political group founded in the United Kingdom by Ian Stuart Donaldson and Nicky Crane in 1987. It is composed of White Nationalists and has links to Combat 18.

Sometimes the code 28 is used to represent Blood & Honour, derived from the second and eighth letters of the Latin alphabet, B and H, and the group uses Nazi symbolism. Its official website self-describes as a "musical based resistance network" and dubs its "global confederacy of freedom fighters" Brotherhood 28.

In the UK, the group used to organise White power concerts by Rock Against Communism (RAC) bands. It publishes a magazine called Blood and Honour. There are official divisions in several countries, including two rival groups in the United States. It is banned in several countries, including Germany, Spain, Russia, and Canada.

History
The roots of Blood & Honour go back to 1977 in the United Kingdom, when the white nationalist National Front (NF) founded the Rock Against Communism (RAC) movement in response to the Anti-Nazi League's Rock Against Racism campaign. By 1980, a new version of Skrewdriver—by then a white power skinhead band—relaunched the RAC movement. Ian Stuart Donaldson, Skrewdriver's singer, was a founder of Blood & Honour and one of its prominent leaders until his death in 1993. Nicky Crane was a co-founder. With the aid of the NF, the White Noise Club (WNC) organised concerts under the RAC name, and the RAC movement grew throughout 1983 and 1984.

In 1986, the NF split into two factions, and around this time, it was discovered that the WNC had been defrauding bands and concert-goers. Several bands left the WNC, including Skrewdriver, No Remorse, Sudden Impact and Brutal Attack. Donaldson decided to break away from the WNC and organise concerts for the NF, so he founded Blood & Honour. By June 1987, with the help of other white power bands, Blood & Honour was launched, along with a magazine of the same name. A concert was held in Morden, Surrey, to commemorate this launch on 5 September, with Skrewdriver, Brutal Attack, Sudden Impact and No Remorse playing to a crowd of 500, including French, Italian and German supporters.

The name was derived from the motto of the Hitler Youth, or HJ, Blut und Ehre, and a song of the same name by the White power band Skrewdriver. and AWB-style triskele.

By the end of 1988, Blood & Honour magazine was a quarterly that had grown from eight to 16 pages after a few issues. The magazine included concert reports, band interviews, readers' letters, RAC record charts and a column called "White Whispers". A mail-order service called Skrewdriver Services soon formed within its pages, selling items such as white power albums, T-shirts and flags; Loyalist music tapes; and Swastika pendants.

The back page of Blood & Honour Issue Number 13 advertised a Skrewdriver concert in London on 12 September 1992. Posters and fliers were posted around the country, advertising the concert and listing a redirection point as Waterloo Rail Station. The night before the concert, Donaldson was attacked in a Burton pub. The next day, police closed down Waterloo Station and the tube station, preventing many people from reaching the redirection point. Hundreds more Blood & Honour supporters who had journeyed from abroad were turned back at ports in Folkestone and Dover. The Blood & Honour supporters clashed with anti-fascist protesters. Missiles such as bricks and champagne bottles taken from bins outside of South Bank restaurants were used during the ensuing riot. Battles ensued for about two hours until the police separated the two groups, and the concert proceeded in the function hall of the Yorkshire Grey pub in Eltham, South-East London. The incident got international media coverage and became known as the "Battle of Waterloo".

In 1992, the newly formed Midlands division organised the annual Blood & Honour White Xmas concert. On 19 December, over 400 supporters gathered at a working men's club in Mansfield to watch No Remorse, Razors Edge and Skrewdriver perform. In 1993, the East Midlands division planned to stage an outdoor festival on 31 July. Donaldson was arrested and served with an injunction order not to perform at the concert. The venue was blockaded by the police, who seized amplifiers and confiscated sound equipment. It was the biggest police operation in the area since the Miners strikes in the early 1980s.

Later that year, the East Midlands division organised a concert for 25 September. Three nights before the concert, Donaldson and a few friends were travelling in a car that spun out of control into a ditch. Donaldson and another passenger died, and other passengers had minor wounds. The following day, 100 Skrewdriver supporters travelled to the Blood & Honour social in the Midlands, unaware of the deaths.

Each year, on or near the anniversary of Donaldson's death, a large memorial concert is held. In 2008, a concert in Redhill, Somerset attracted widespread BBC, radio and newspaper coverage. The memorial concert to mark the 20th anniversary of the death of Donaldson reportedly was the biggest associated gig in the UK with between 1,000 and 1,200 people attending. On the 23rd anniversary of the death of founder, Ian Stuart Donaldson, the annual memorial gig once again attracted international television and media coverage.

Description and symbolism

The group is composed of White Nationalists and has links to Combat 18. Its official website self-describes as a "musical based resistance network" and dubs its "global confederacy of freedom fighters" Brotherhood 28.

Sometimes the code 28 is used to represent Blood & Honour, derived from the second and eighth letters of the Latin alphabet, B and H. Though different national chapters of Blood & Honour use different Nationalist symbols based on their location, common symbolic traits include the usage of a modernised Blackletter script, colours of the Nazi German flag, and other Nazi symbolism, including the Totenkopf Death's Head insignia of the SS-Totenkopfverbände and concentration camp units.

International groups
There are official divisions in several countries. In the United States, two rival groups claim the name: Blood and Honour Council USA and Blood and Honour America Division.

Blood & Honour is banned in several countries. Blood & Honour Germany was outlawed in Germany in 2000, Spain in 2011, and Russia in 2012. In 2019, the government of Canada placed Blood & Honour on its list of designated terrorist groups.

In 1999, some Blood & Honour groups published support on their official websites for the Malexander murders in Sweden.

Blood & Honour Australia & the Southern Cross Hammerskins have been organising the annual Ian Donaldson Memorial concert in Melbourne since 1994. Reports by the media that the concert in 2019 was cancelled at the last minute were false, as it went ahead as it does each year without incident.

See also
 Bloed-Bodem-Eer en Trouw (Flemish splinter group of Blood & Honour Vlaanderen)
 List of neo-Nazi bands
 List of neo-Nazi organizations
 Nazi punk
 Vlaamse Militanten Orde
 White power skinhead
 List of white nationalist organizations

References

Further reading
 Lowles, Nick; Silver, Steve (eds.) (1998). White Noise: Inside the International Nazi Skinhead Scene. London. .
 London, Paul. Nazi Rock Star: A Biography of Ian Stuart.
 Marshall, George (1990). Spirit of '69: A Skinhead Bible. Dunoon, Scotland: ST Publishing. .
 Marshall, George (1996). Skinhead Nation. S.T. Publishing. .

External links

Blood & Honour symbol, in the Anti-Defamation League's "Hate On Display" database

Musical groups established in 1987
Neo-Nazi music
Neo-Nazi organisations in the United Kingdom
Neo-Nazi organizations in the United States
Organizations designated as terrorist by Canada
Organizations based in Europe designated as terrorist
Anti-communist organizations